Laetacara is a small genus of cichlids native to freshwater habitats in tropical and subtropical South America, ranging from the upper Orinoco River basin in Venezuela to the Paraná River basin Argentina. The genus is also collectively known as the smiling acaras. Like all cichlids, Laetacara species have well-developed brood care.

All members of the genus are monogamous, open spawning cichlids. They are popular in the fishkeeping hobby and are frequently kept in aquariums.

Species
There are currently seven recognized species in this genus:
 Laetacara araguaiae Ottoni & W. J. E. M. Costa, 2009
 Laetacara curviceps (C. G. E. Ahl, 1923) (Flag acara)
 Laetacara dorsigera (Heckel, 1840) (Redbreast acara)
 Laetacara flamannellus Ottoni et al., 2012
 Laetacara flavilabris (Cope, 1870)
 Laetacara fulvipinnis Staeck & I. Schindler, 2007
 Laetacara thayeri (Steindachner, 1875)

See also
List of freshwater aquarium fish species

References 

Cichlasomatini
Fish of South America
Cichlid genera
Taxa named by Sven O. Kullander